Beatitude is the debut album released by Ric Ocasek, lead singer and principal songwriter of The Cars.  It was released by Geffen Records in 1982. It features Greg Hawkes of The Cars on keyboards, as well as Jules Shear and Stephen Hague from Jules and the Polar Bears.

Title 
The Beatitudes are eight blessings recounted by Jesus in the Sermon on the Mount in the Gospel of Matthew. The title is pronounced "beat-itude", a portmanteau of the words "beat" and "attitude", and pays homage to the 1950s poetry magazine Beatitude, which featured work by poets including Allen Ginsberg. The 1997 Geffen CD issue of the album misprinted the title on the disc as "Beautitude".

Track listing 
All tracks composed by Ric Ocasek, except where noted.

 "Jimmy Jimmy" – 4:57
 "Something to Grab For" – 3:43
 "Prove" – 3:56
 "I Can't Wait" – 3:43
 "Connect Up to Me" – 7:37
 "A Quick One" – 3:37
 "Out of Control" (Ocasek, Greg Hawkes) – 4:41
 "Take a Walk" – 4:38
 "Sneak Attack" – 3:55
 "Time Bomb" – 5:03

Although the album track "Connect Up to Me" was given an extended 12" remix, it was never released as a single. The extended mix is on the cassette and CD editions.
The album peaked at #28 on the Billboard 200 in spring of 1983.

Personnel

Musicians
Ric Ocasek – vocals, guitar, keyboards
Jules Shear, Steve Cataldo, Antonio DePortago – vocals
Roger Greenawalt, Casey Lindström – guitar
Fuzzbee Morse – guitar, keyboards
Greg Hawkes – keyboards
Stephen Hague – keyboards
Akio Akashi, Darryl Jenifer – bass
Deric Dyer – saxophone
Stephen George, "Miss Linn" – drums

Production 
Ric Ocasek – producer
David Hegelmeier – tape operator
Ian Taylor – engineer
Walter Turbitt – assistant engineer
George Marino – mastering
Jeri McManus – graphics, layout
Bob Carlos Clarke – photography
All songs published by Ric Ocasek Music, except "Out of Control" (published by Ric Ocasek Music/Oversnare Music-Lido Music)

References

Ric Ocasek albums
1982 debut albums
Albums produced by Ric Ocasek
Geffen Records albums
Albums recorded at Electric Lady Studios